Tzihuacxochitzin I was a Queen consort of Azcapotzalco as a wife of the king Tezozomoc, who was very famous.

She was a daughter of the noble dignitary called Huitzilaztatzin. She married Tezozomoc, and it is mentioned by Chimalpahin that they had ten children:
Epcoatzin
Icel Azcatl
Itzpapalocihuatl
Aculnahuacatl Tzaqualcatl
Tlacochcuecihuatl
Chichilocuili
Maxtla
Xaltemoctzin
Xiuhcanahualtzin
Quaquapitzahuac

Xaltemoctzin had a daughter called Tzihuacxochitzin, named after his mother.

Tzihuacxochitzin was a grandmother of Tecollotzin, Tlacateotl, Matlalatzin and Huacaltzintli. It is possible that she was a mother of the queen Ayauhcihuatl, who was a mother of Aztec emperor Chimalpopoca.

References

Nahua nobility
Indigenous Mexican women
Nobility of the Americas